The 1986–87 Southwest Indoor Soccer League season was the inaugural season of the United Soccer Leagues.

League standings

Semifinal
 The Lubbock Lazers defeated the Oklahoma City Warriors in a best of 3 series.

Final

Honors
Most Valuable Player:  Greg Nichols
Leading scorer:  Greg Nichols
Assist Leader:  Danny Perge
Goalkeeper of the Year:  Steve Myers
Rookie of the Year:  Ty Kongdara
Coach of the Year:  Chico Villar

References

2
2
USISL indoor seasons